Scoparia yakushimana is a moth in the family Crambidae. It was described by Inoue in 1982. It is found in Japan (Yakushima).

References

Moths described in 1982
Scorparia